Hoseynabad (also Romanized as Ḩoseynābād and Hoseyn Ābād) is a village in Esfandaqeh Rural District, in the Central District of Jiroft County, Kerman Province, Iran. At the 2006 census, its population was 550, in 108 families.

References 

Populated places in Jiroft County